Gehra Zakham is a 1981 Indian Bollywood film directed by Deepak Bahry and produced by M. P. Jain. It stars Vinod Mehra, Ranjeeta in pivotal roles.

Cast
 Vinod Mehra as Vijay
 Ranjeeta as Shabnam
 Kader Khan as Magrani
 Amjad Khan as Shabbir
 Om Shivpuri as Mirza

Soundtrack

External links

1980s Hindi-language films
1981 films
Films scored by R. D. Burman
Films directed by Deepak Bahry